Svetlana Sergeyevna Boldykova (born 7 July 1982 in Tashtagol, Kemerovo Oblast) is a Russian professional snowboarder based in Tashtagol. Boldikova has to date competed in one Winter Olympic Games in 2006 where she would finish 8th along with several world cups but has to date only achieved one podium position a third placing in 2007 in Korea.

Footnotes

External links
 

1982 births
Living people
People from Tashtagol
Russian female snowboarders
Olympic snowboarders of Russia
Snowboarders at the 2006 Winter Olympics
Snowboarders at the 2010 Winter Olympics
Sportspeople from Kemerovo Oblast